The 1985 NCAA Division II baseball tournament decided the champion of baseball in NCAA Division II for the 1985 season. Florida Southern coach Chuck Anderson won his first title with the team, while Florida Southern first baseman Tom Temrowski was named tournament MOP.

Regionals
The regional round consisted of six groupings.  Four of them matched four teams in a double-elimination tournament while the remaining two played best of five series for the right to advance to the College World Series.

Northeast Regional

South Atlantic Regional

South Regional

Central Regional

Midwest Regional

West Regional

College World Series

See also
 1985 NCAA Division I baseball tournament
 1985 NCAA Division II softball tournament
 1985 NCAA Division III baseball tournament
 1985 NAIA World Series

References

Tournament
NCAA Division II Baseball Tournament
1985 in sports in Alabama